Néstor Abrahan Camacho Ledesma (born 15 October 1987) is a Paraguayan footballer who plays for Paraguayan Primera División club Club Olimpia. Mainly an attacking midfielder or winger, he can also appear as a central midfielder.

Club career
Born in Villa Florida, Misiones, Camacho was a Libertad youth graduate. He made his first team debut during the 2007 season, appearing in five matches.

In 2009 Camacho was loaned to fellow Primera División side Rubio Ñú, for one year. He scored his first senior goal on 22 November, netting the first in a 2–0 home win against 2 de Mayo.

Camacho scored 11 goals for Rubio Ñú during the 2010 campaign, with his side achieving an impressive fifth position. On 16 February 2011 he moved abroad, signing for Argentine Primera División side Newell's Old Boys.

After being sparingly used, Camacho switched teams and countries again, joining Colombia's Deportivo Cali on 12 August 2013. The following year, he returned to his first club Libertad.

On 31 July 2015 Camacho moved to Campeonato Brasileiro Série A side Avaí. He contributed with 12 appearances and one goal, suffering team relegation.

On 20 January 2016 Camacho moved back to Paraguay and joined Guaraní. He finished the year with a career-best 18 league goals, as his side was crowned champions.

International career
On 24 August 2010 Camacho was called up to Paraguay national team by manager Gerardo Martino for friendlies against Japan and China. He made his full international debut on 4 September, starting in a 0–1 loss against the former in Yokohama.

Camacho scored his first international goal on 6 September 2011, netting the first in a 3–0 win at Honduras through a penalty.

Career statistics

Club

International

International goals
Scores and results list Paraguay's goal tally first.

Honours
Deportivo Cali
Superliga Colombiana: 2014

Libertad
Paraguayan Primera División: 2014-I, 2014-II

Guaraní
Paraguayan Primera División: 2016

References

External links

1987 births
Living people
People from Misiones Department
Paraguayan footballers
Association football midfielders
Club Libertad footballers
Club Rubio Ñu footballers
Club Guaraní players
Newell's Old Boys footballers
Deportivo Cali footballers
Avaí FC players
Club Olimpia footballers
Paraguayan Primera División players
Categoría Primera A players
Argentine Primera División players
Campeonato Brasileiro Série A players
Paraguay international footballers
Paraguayan expatriate footballers
Paraguayan expatriate sportspeople in Argentina
Paraguayan expatriate sportspeople in Colombia
Paraguayan expatriate sportspeople in Brazil
Expatriate footballers in Argentina
Expatriate footballers in Colombia
Expatriate footballers in Brazil